Northern Border University (NBU) is located in Arar, Saudi Arabia. It was founded in 2007. It contains 16 colleges: 9 in Arar, 4 in Rafha,  2 in Turayf, and 1 in Al Uwayqilah. It has a variety of majors in multiple levels, including bachelor's and master's degrees programs across various fields, including business, computer science, engineering, education, law, medicine, pharmacy, and sciences..

NB University has partnerships and collaborations with various international universities and institutions, including the University of Nebraska-Lincoln in the United States, the University of Stavanger in Norway, and the University of Strathclyde in the United Kingdom.

References

External links 

2007 establishments in Saudi Arabia
Universities and colleges in Saudi Arabia
Educational institutions established in 2007